Pago is a shield volcano in the center of Tutuila Island, the largest island of American Samoa in the South Pacific Ocean. 

The volcano was formed by subaerial eruptions between 1.54 and 1.28 million years ago. Activity on Pago Volcano ended with emplacement of trachyte bodies with ages of 1.03 ± 0.01 Ma.

The Pago Volcano caldera was formed 1.27+-0.02 million years ago. The southeast part of the caldera makes up Pago Pago Harbor, one of the world's largest natural harbors. The northwest rim, Maugaloa Ridge, creates the southern border of the National Park of American Samoa.

References

Volcanoes of American Samoa
Tutuila
Pago Pago
Extinct volcanoes
Polygenetic shield volcanoes